Oglethorpe's Regiment of Foot was an infantry regiment of the British Army formed for service in North America during the War of Jenkins' Ear. It was commanded by James Oglethorpe, first Governor of Georgia.

Service
The raising of the regiment, ranked as the 42nd Regiment of Foot, was authorised in August 1737. The unit formed at Savannah in the following year.

They took part in the Siege of St Augustine in June and July 1740 and the Battles of Bloody Marsh and Gully Hole Creek near Fort Frederica in July 1742.

The regiment was disbanded at the end of the conflict on 24 November 1748. Some of its discharged soldiers enlisted in the South Carolina Independent Companies.

References

Sources
 Cashin, Edwar J. (2009). Guardians of the Valley. The University of South Carolina Press.
 Foote, William Alfred (1966). The American Independent Companies of the British Army 1664-1764. Thesis - University of California, Los Angeles.

Infantry regiments of the British Army
Military units and formations disestablished in 1748
Military units and formations established in 1737